Fiks Fare is a daily show on Albanian television station Top Channel. It premiered on 19 December 2002. It is co-hosted by Devis Muka and Dorian Ramaliu. Fiks Fare uses humor and satire to discuss negative aspects of society, such as corruption, fraud, law-breaking by public officials, human rights violations and development issues. It includes entertainment elements such as dance and music. Its popularity and its simple language has made it an important means of raising awareness. Fiks Fare is quoted in the academic journal Current Anthropology as an innovative format of activism in the field of anti-corruption.

See also

References

Albanian television shows
Top Channel original programming